Bountiful Summer is a 1951 Soviet comedy drama film directed by Boris Barnet and starring Nina Arkhipova, Nikolay Kryuchkov and Viktor Dobrovolsky. The film is set on a collective farm in Ukraine.

It was shot at the Kiev Film Studio in 1950, but released the following year. It was also released in America the same year in a subtitled version by Artkino Pictures. The film was shot using a version of the sovcolor process.

Cast
 Nina Arkhipova as Vera Groshko 
 Nikolay Kryuchkov as Nazar Protsenko 
 Viktor Dobrovolsky as Ruban 
 Marina Bebutova as Oksana Podpruzhenko  
 Anton Dunajsky as Prokopchuk 
 Georgi Gumilevsky as Musi Antonovich 
 Alla Kazanskaya as Zoological technician  
 Muza Krepkogorskaya as Darka  
 Mikhail Kuznetsov as Peter Sereda  
 Vera Kuznetsova as Ekaterina Matveievna 
 Yelena Maksimova as Kolodchka  
 Konstantin Sorokin as Teslyuk  
 Mikhail Vysotsky as Podpruzhenko  
 Zoya Tolbuzina as Vera

References

Bibliography 
 Peter Kenez. Cinema and Soviet Society: From the Revolution to the Death of Stalin. I.B.Tauris, 2001.

External links 
 

1951 films
Soviet comedy-drama films
1951 comedy-drama films
1950s Russian-language films
Films directed by Boris Barnet
Films set in Ukraine